Down Twisted is a 1987 thriller film, directed by Albert Pyun, starring Carey Lowell, Charles Rocket, Courteney Cox, Norbert Weisser, Linda Kerridge, Trudi Dochtermann and Nicholas Guest.

Plot
A naïve, good-hearted Los Angeles waitress does not think twice about helping her troubled roommate. Her help lands her in Central America fleeing for her life with a grungy mercenary.

Cast
 Carey Lowell as Maxine
 Charles Rocket as Reno
 Trudy Dochterman as Michelle (Trudi Dochtermann)
 Thom Mathews as Damalas
 Norbert Weisser as Alsandro Deltoid
 Linda Kerridge as Soames
 Nicholas Guest as Brady
 Galyn Görg as Blake (Galyn Gorg)
 Courteney Cox as Tarah
 Bambi Jordan as Suzie
 Ken Wright as Mr. Wicks
 Alec Markham as Captain
 Eduardo Cassab as Sargento
 Christabel Wigley as Theona
 Joe Holland as Mickey (Tim Holland)

Release
The film was given a limited theatrical release in March 1987. The home video release was in the United States in 1990 by Media Home Entertainment.

References

External links

1987 films
1987 action films
1980s crime drama films
1980s crime thriller films
Films set in Central America
Films set in Los Angeles
Films shot in Mexico
Films directed by Albert Pyun
American crime drama films
Golan-Globus films
1987 drama films
Films produced by Menahem Golan
Films produced by Yoram Globus
1980s English-language films
1980s American films